AKM Jahangir Hossain (1954 – 24 December 2020) was a Bangladesh Awami League politician and a 4-term Jatiya Sangsad member representing the Patuakhali-3 constituency.

Career
Hossain was elected to the parliament from  Patuakhali-3 in 1991, 1996, 2001 and 2014 as a Bangladesh Awami League candidate. He was made the State Minister of Textiles in 1998 in the First Sheikh Hasina Cabinet. He did not receive the nomination for 2008 general election from Bangladesh Awami League for his support of reforms in the league during the 2006–08 Bangladeshi political crisis. The nomination went to Golam Maula Rony. In 2013, he was removed from all committees of Bangladesh Awami League.

Hossain died from COVID-19 complications during the COVID-19 pandemic in Bangladesh on 24 December 2020, at the Bangabandhu Sheikh Mujib Medical University Hospital in Dhaka.

References

1954 births
2020 deaths
People from Patuakhali district
Awami League politicians
Government ministers of Bangladesh
Deaths from the COVID-19 pandemic in Bangladesh
Place of birth missing
5th Jatiya Sangsad members
7th Jatiya Sangsad members
8th Jatiya Sangsad members
10th Jatiya Sangsad members